Damian Cupido (born 11 March 1982) is a former professional Australian rules footballer who played for the  and Essendon Football Club in the Australian Football League (AFL).

AFL career

Cupido's talent was considered to be immense, with the highly skilled young star winning an AFL Rising Star nomination in 2001.

In 2003, Cupido enjoyed his best year, he booted 40 goals for the season in his small/medium forward role and was a very exciting and at times dominant player.
The 2004 year had Cupido suffering for most of the year with a knee injury. It was hoped he could bounce back in 2005, but it turned out he could not. Cupido had noticeably gained weight suffered a public blast from coach Kevin Sheedy in the media, and Cupido was not only dropped to the Bendigo Bombers in the VFL, but one level further, to the Bendigo reserves team. Eventually he fought his way back into the Essendon side but never looked like recapturing his form. At the end of the 2005 season, Cupido was delisted from the Bombers.

SANFL career
Cupido continued his football career in the SANFL with South Adelaide Football Club in the 2006 season, hoping to get a second chance in the AFL via the 2007 Pre-season draft. He did not get picked in the draft after his first season and left South Adelaide to play for West Adelaide, where he was the club's leading goal scorer in 2007. In 2009, Cupido was stood down from West Adelaide to deal with a gambling problem.  He played a total of 72 games in the SANFL; 51 with West Adelaide and 21 with South Adelaide.

Itinerant player

In 2010, Cupido was recruited to North Albury Football Club in the Ovens and Murray Football League.
After spending a year travelling each week up to Albury to play, Cupido decided to return to his junior club Croydon in the Eastern Football Netball League. After a season and a half, he crossed to Mt Evelyn. It was at Croydon that he had a contact with a player from the Northern Territory and he went north for the wet season. In 2013 Cupido kicked a Northern Territory record of 140 goals for a season.  He backed up his goalkicking by kicking a century for Ouyen United in the Sunraysia league a few months later.  After his success at Ouyen he coached Murray Football League club Rumbalara to the 2014 premiership while kicking 86 goals. He added another 78 goals the following year.
In 2016 he was appointed coach of Airport West but left after four games, he was cleared to Bacchus Marsh for the rest of the year. He had a permit to play a game for Henty in the Hume Football League.
In 2017 he played half a season with Bairnsdale before ending the year with East Burwood. In 2018 he kicked 114 goals playing for Henty while also playing a permit game for Undera. In 2019 he again played for Henty while also playing a permit game for Moyhu.

At the age of 39 after a season off because of the Covid pandemic he played for Brocklesby/Burrumbuttock in the Hume FL. He celebrated his 40th birthday by kicking 105 goals for Girgarre in the Kyabram DFL in 2022.

References

External links 
Bomberland Profile – Damian Cupido

Cupido Faces the Axe (April 2005)

1982 births
Living people
VFL/AFL players born outside Australia
Brisbane Lions players
Essendon Football Club players
South Adelaide Football Club players
West Adelaide Football Club players
Eastern Ranges players
North Albury Football Club players
South African emigrants to Australia
Australian rules footballers from Victoria (Australia)
Southern Districts Football Club players
Nightcliff Football Club players
Bairnsdale Football Club players
Bendigo Football Club players
Coloured South African people